ISO 31-7 is the part of international standard ISO 31 that defines names and symbols for quantities and units related to acoustics. It is superseded by ISO 80000-8.

Its definitions include:

Acoustics
00031-07